Uzan Eskandari (also Romanized as Ūzān Eskandarī; also known as Torkamān, Torkmān, and Ūzān Torkamān) is a village in Torkaman Rural District, in the Central District of Urmia County, West Azerbaijan Province, Iran. At the 2006 census, its population was 333, in 83 families.

References 

Populated places in Urmia County